Jesenný is a municipality and village in Semily District in the Liberec Region of the Czech Republic. It has about 500 inhabitants.

Administrative parts
The village of Bohuňovsko is an administrative part of Jesenný.

References

Villages in Semily District